Oregon Hill is an unincorporated community in Rockingham County, North Carolina, United States.

Geography

Oregon Hill is located at latitude 36.448 and longitude -79.637. The elevation is 781 feet.

References

External links

Unincorporated communities in Rockingham County, North Carolina
Unincorporated communities in North Carolina